Neranjan Priyadarshana Dullewe Wijeyeratne (Sinhala: නෙරංජන් ප්‍රියදර්ශන දූල්ලෑව විජයරත්න) (born 9 August 1956) (known as Neranjan Wijeyeratne) is a Sri Lankan. He was Diyawadana Nilame (Chief lay Custodian) of the Sri Dalada Maligawa, Kandy for 20 years from 1985 to 2005. Wijeyeratne was former United National Party politician and ex chief organiser for the Galagedara Electorate in Kandy District and former Leader of the Opposition in the Kandy Municipal Council.

Early life

Born to Nissanka Wijeyeratne & Nita Dullewe Wijeyeratne he is the eldest of three brothers and a sister. They are Mano, Anuradha, Lankesh & Nishangani. His father Nissanka Wijeyeratne and grandfather Sir Edwin Wijeyeratne were prominent politicians who had become cabinet ministers and his brothers Mano  was a Non-Cabinet Minister of Enterprise Development and Plantation Services and Anuradha is a former Provincial Councillor and had been the Acting Diyawadana Nilame on several occasions. Neranjan Wijeyeratne was educated at Royal College, Colombo.

Diyawadana Nilame
Following his father's footsteps, he was elected Diyawadana Nilame (Chief lay Custodian) of the Sri Dalada Maligawa, Kandy in March 1985 and served for a total of 20 years, until 2005, being re-elected once again in May 1995. Prior to being named the Diyawadana Nilame he served a term of 5 years as Basnayake Nilame (Lay Custodian) of Lankathilaka Maha Vishnu devalaya, Kandy. He was noted for his ability when the temple was restored following the LTTE bombing in 1998. He was also responsible for the construction of the famous 'golden fence' around Sri Dalada maligawa. He set up the Dalada Museum, which houses a historic collection of artifacts related to the Temple of the Tooth and Buddhism in Sri Lanka. The 'Temple of the Tooth Special Development Fund and Sri Dalada Maligawa Buddhist Welfare Fund was set up by him. Meanwhile, the Pallekale Sri Lanka International Buddhist Academy (Thai Sri Lanka International Buddhist Institution) with a modern conference hall that can accommodate up to 1000 guests was established by Neranjan Wijeyeratne while he was Diyawadana Nilame. During his tenure, he maintained close links with Japanese, Chinese, Thai and Myanmar religious dignitaries and played a major role in promoting Sri Lanka's Buddhist heritage.

Politics
After stepping down as Diyawadana Nilame following his second term, he went into active politics.

Family
He is married to Devika Mediwake Daughter of Dr Laxminath & Chintha Mediwake, and Grand Daughter of William Gopallawa (first President of Sri Lanka) and has two children, a daughter Mokshana Nerandika Wijeyeratne (Environmental Specialist, The World Bank (Colombo office). & a son, Dr. Navindra Wijeyeratne (BS, MS & PhD from University of Central Florida, Florida, USA) he is a Assistant Professor at Florida Polytechnic University, Florida, USA.

See also
List of political families in Sri Lanka

References 

Sources
   My two Decades at Sri Dalada Maligawa - A
   My two Decades at Sri Dalada Maligawa - B

External links
  The Wijeyeratne Ancestry
  The Ratwatte Ancestry
 The Gopallawa Ancestry

1956 births
Alumni of Royal College, Colombo
Diyawadana Nilames
Living people
Politicians from Kandy
Sinhalese politicians
Sri Lankan Buddhists
United National Party politicians
Neranjan